The national flag of Turkey, officially the Turkish flag, is a red flag featuring a white star and crescent. The flag is often called "the red flag", and is referred to as "the red banner" in the Turkish national anthem. The current Turkish flag is directly derived from the late Ottoman flag, which had been adopted in the late 18th century and acquired its final form in 1844. The measures, geometric proportions, and exact tone of red of the flag of Turkey were legally standardized with the Turkish Flag Law on 29 May 1936.

History 

The star and crescent design appears on Ottoman flags beginning in the late 18th or early 19th century. The white star and crescent moon on red as the flag of the Ottoman Empire was introduced 1844.

After the declaration of the Republic of Turkey in 1923, the new administrative regime maintained the last flag of the Ottoman Empire. Proportional standardizations were introduced in the Turkish Flag Law of 1936.

Legendary origins 
In accounting for the crescent and star symbol, the Ottomans sometimes referred to a legendary dream of the eponymous founder of the Ottoman house, Osman I, in which he is reported to have seen a moon rising from the breast of Sheikh Edebali whose daughter he sought to marry. "When full, it descended into his own breast. Then from his loins there sprang a tree, which as it grew came to cover the whole world with the shadow of its green and beautiful branches." Beneath it Osman saw the world spread out before him, surmounted by the crescent.

Legal basis 
Fundamentals of the Turkish flag were laid down by Turkish Flag Law No. 2994 on 29 May 1936 during the Republic period of Turkey. Turkish Flag Regulation No. 2/7175 dated 28 July 1937, and Supplementary Regulation No. 11604/2 dated 29 July 1939, were enacted to describe how the flag law would be implemented. The Turkish Flag Law No. 2893 dated 22 September 1983, and Published in the Official Gazette on 24 September 1983, was promulgated six months after its publication. According to Article 9 of Law No. 2893, a statute including the fundamentals of the implementation was also published.

Usage of flag of Turkey in Northern Cyprus 

Article 5 of the Flag Law of the Turkish Republic of Northern Cyprus states that "The Turkish Flag shall continue to be the national flag of the Turkish People of Cyprus". According to the same article, the flag of Turkey can be flown from buildings of the Security Forces, by Government Departments, from the premises of public institutions and establishments and others with the flag of Northern Cyprus. Article 10 of the same law outlaws insults against the flag of Turkey and Article 11 punishes them if they were carried out on purpose.

Construction

Colors
In an RGB color space, the red color of the Turkish flag is composed of 89% red, 3.9% green, and 9% blue (in hexadecimal color code #E30A17). In a CMYK color space, it is composed of 0% cyan, 95.6% magenta, 89.9% yellow and 11% black. It has a hue angle of 356.4 degrees, a saturation of 91.6%, and a lightness of 46.5%. The red color on the Turkish flag is vivid red and this color can be obtained by blending #FF142E with #C70000. The closest websafe color is: #d11919.

The colors approximation is listed below:

Dimensions
The specification below, given by Turkish Flag Law, implies that the distance between (the left edge of) the inner circle of the crescent and a vertical line connecting the two pointed ends of the crescent is  G = 0.34875 G; thus, the left point of the star intrudes about 0.0154 G beyond that line.

Display and use

State institutions 
The flag is always displayed prominently in state institutions from schools to ministries. The Beştepe Presidential Complex, Parliament, ministries, schools, military, councils, governors buildings, muhtar's offices, bridges, airports, and every state owned building in the country features one or more flags of Turkey.

Uniforms 
On military uniforms the flag is displayed on a patch either on the right shoulder or on the front of the uniform. Helmets can display the flag too on the front or the sides. Flight suits, navy uniforms, Jandarma uniforms and others feature the flag on shoulder patches or helmets. Along with uniforms several emblems and patches display the flag with prominence or minor alteration.

Days of display 
Turkey celebrates many national events such as battle victories and Republic Day. People come to the streets with their flags to celebrate such days. On other occasions the public uses the flag heavily when protesting or commemorating certain events or deaths respectively. Statues and monuments may be draped with the flag while marches and songs are played. On television screens the flag is displayed in celebration of such events too with the portrait of Atatürk next to it. The flag may also be presented at half staff in mourning of tragic events or important days.

Funerals 
The flag has a prominent display on state and military funerals. A burial flag is always draped over the deceased coffin and is carried by the military police or relatives of the deceased. Soldiers of all types and the Presidential Guard also carry the coffin at times. Many attendees also feature the flag on their lapels along with an image of the deceased.

Gallery

See also
 National emblem of Turkey
 Flag of Azerbaijan
 Flag of East Turkestan
 Flag of Northern Cyprus
 Flags of the Ottoman Empire
 Flag of Tunisia
 List of Turkish flags

Notes and references

External links

Türk Bayrağı Kanunu, the Turkish text of the Turkish Flag Law No. 2893 dated September 22, 1983, establishing the proportions, production, and rules of usage of the flag of Turkey

Turkey
Turkey
National symbols of Turkey
Turkey
Turkey